Chapman Bay is a small inlet of Henderson Inlet, which drains into Puget Sound in Washington. It is located in Thurston County and the nearest city is Olympia, the state capital.

References

Bodies of water of Thurston County, Washington
History of Olympia, Washington
Geography of Olympia, Washington
Inlets of Washington (state)